McManus Glacier is a glacier flowing north into Palestrina Glacier, in northwestern Alexander Island, Antarctica. It separates Lassus Mountains on the west from Sofia University Mountains on the east. The glacier was surveyed by the British Antarctic Survey (BAS), 1975–76, and was named by the UK Antarctic Place-Names Committee in 1980 after Alan James McManus, a BAS cook at Grytviken and Faraday Research Station, 1971–73, and at Adelaide Island and Rothera Research Station, 1975–78.

See also

 List of glaciers in the Antarctic

References

Glaciers of Alexander Island